Brodiaea elegans is a species of flowering plant in the cluster-lily genus known by the common names harvest brodiaea, elegant brodiaea, and elegant cluster-lily.

The bulb is native to the mountain ranges of California and Oregon, where it grows in woodlands and meadows.

Description 
Brodiaea elegans is a perennial that produces a stout stemlike inflorescence up to 50 centimeters tall. It bears showy flowers on pedicels up to 10 centimeters long.

Each flower has six curving tepals up to 3 centimeters long in shades of bright purple. In the center of the flower are white or pale purple sterile stamens known as staminodes; these are flat with pointed or toothed tips and between one half and one centimeter in length. Next to these are the fertile stamens topped with large anthers.

In Northern California, Brodiaea elegans is one of the later blooming wildflowers, often seen in May.

References

External links 
 Jepson Manual Treatment
 USDA Plants Profile
 Flora of North America
 Coe State Park Photos
 Photo gallery

elegans
Flora of California
Flora of Oregon
Flora of the Klamath Mountains
Flora of the Sierra Nevada (United States)
Natural history of the California chaparral and woodlands
Natural history of the California Coast Ranges
Natural history of the San Francisco Bay Area
Plants described in 1939
Flora without expected TNC conservation status